Parameshwara College ( Paramēsvarā Kallūri) was one of the leading Hindu schools in Ceylon (now Sri Lanka). It was founded by Sir P. Ramanathan in 1921. His idea was to make the school a university. It began as a teacher training school and later conducted classes for the London Matriculation and Cambridge exams. Later, it followed the S.S.C. Exam and University Entrance syllabus. The school premises were taken over by the government in 1974 to make way for the newly created Jaffna Campus of the University of Sri Lanka (later University of Jaffna). The students and teachers who were attending the school were sent to nearby schools. The old building is still there as the entrance to the University of Jaffna.

See also
:Category:Alumni of Parameshwara College, Jaffna

References

1921 establishments in Ceylon
1974 disestablishments in Sri Lanka
Defunct schools in Sri Lanka
Educational institutions disestablished in 1974
Educational institutions established in 1921
Schools in Jaffna
University of Jaffna